Media Bias/Fact Check (MBFC) is an American website founded in 2015 by editor Dave M. Van Zandt. It uses a 0–10 scale to rate sites in two areas: bias and factual accuracy.

Methodology 

Van Zandt and his team use a 0–10 scale to rate sites for biased wording, headlines, actuality, sourcing, story choices, and political affiliation. There is a criterion for factual accuracy based on failed fact checks. The group has also sorted hundreds of web pages into the ideological categories of: Left, Left Center, Least Biased, Right Center, and Right. Van Zandt admits he is not an expert and that "his methods are not rigorously objective."

Usage 
The site has been used by researchers at the University of Michigan to create a tool called the "Iffy Quotient", which draws data from Media Bias/Fact Check and NewsWhip to track the prevalence of "fake news" and questionable sources on social media.

Reception 
According to Daniel Funke and Alexios Mantzarlis of the Poynter Institute, "Media Bias/Fact Check is a widely cited source for news stories and even studies about misinformation, despite the fact that its method is in no way scientific." In 2018, the Columbia Journalism Review identified Media Bias/Fact Check as "an armchair media analysis." Additionally, the Columbia Journalism Review described Media Bias/Fact Check as an amateur attempt at categorizing media bias and characterized their assessments as "subjective assessments [that] leave room for human biases, or even simple inconsistencies, to creep in". A study published in Scientific Reports wrote: "While [Media Bias/Fact Check's] credibility is sometimes questioned, it has been regarded as accurate enough to be used as ground-truth for e.g. media bias classifiers, fake news studies, and automatic fact-checking systems."

See also 
 Ad Fontes Media
 AllSides
 NewsGuard

References

External links 
 

Fact-checking websites
Internet properties established in 2015
Criticism of journalism
Media bias